Child of the Night (Spanish:El hijo de la noche) is a 1950 Spanish drama film directed by Ricardo Gascón and starring Osvaldo Genazzani, María Rosa Salgado and José Suárez.

Cast
  Osvaldo Genazzani as Lauro 
 María Rosa Salgado as Marion Brown 
 José Suárez as Darío 
 Enrique Guitart as Martín  
 Félix de Pomés as Jean Barrière  
 Elva de Bethancourt as Ernestina  
 María Severini as Alicia Brown 
 Consuelo de Nieva as Josefina  
 Joe La Roe as Santiago  
 Luis Villasiul as Oculista  
 Pedro Mascaró as Administrador 
 Modesto Cid as Juez

References

Bibliography
 de España, Rafael. Directory of Spanish and Portuguese film-makers and films. Greenwood Press, 1994.

External links 

1950 films
1950 drama films
Spanish drama films
1950s Spanish-language films
Films based on Spanish novels
Films directed by Ricardo Gascón
Spanish black-and-white films
1950s Spanish films